Spanish Renaissance architecture was that style of Renaissance architecture in the last decades of the 15th century. Renaissance evolved firstly in Florence and then Rome and other parts of the Italian Peninsula as the result of Renaissance humanism and a revived interest in Classical architecture. In Spain, the Renaissance began to be grafted to Gothic forms as mathematicians and engineers rediscovered building as one of the technological sciences.  In the time of King Felipe II (1556–1589), the Renaissance influence expanded throughout the territory thanks to the dissemination of architectural treatises (Vitrubio, Alberti, Serlio, Palladio, Vignola and Sagredo, among others). 

In the Hispanic expression of the Renaissance, Italian forms merged with the reminiscences of other previous native styles. The style started to spread mainly by local architects: that is the cause of the creation of a specifically Spanish Renaissance, that brought the influence of Italian architecture, sometimes from illuminated books and paintings, mixed with Gothic tradition and local idiosyncrasy. The new style is called Plateresque, because of the extremely decorated facades, that brought to the mind the decorative motifs of the intricately detailed work of silversmiths, the "Plateros". Classical orders and candelabra motifs (a candelieri) combined freely into symmetrical wholes. Examples include the facades of the University of Salamanca and of the Convent of San Marcos in León.

As decades passed, the Gothic influence disappeared and the research of an orthodox classicism reached high levels. Although Plateresco is a commonly used term to define most of the architectural production of the late 15th and first half of 16th century, some architects acquired a more sober personal style, like Diego Siloe, and Andrés de Vandelvira in Andalusia, and Alonso de Covarrubias and Rodrigo Gil de Hontañón in Castile. This phase of Spanish Renaissance is called Purism. 
 

From the mid 16th century, under such architects as Pedro Machuca, Juan Bautista de Toledo, and Juan de Herrera, there was a much closer adherence to the art of ancient Rome, sometimes anticipating Mannerism. An example of this is the Palace of Charles V in Granada built by Pedro Machuca. A new style emerged with the work of Juan Bautista de Toledo, and Juan de Herrera in the Escorial: the Herrerian style, extremely sober and naked, reached high levels of perfection in the use of granite ashlar work, and influenced the Spanish architecture of both the peninsula and the colonies for over a century. The Spanish building profession during this time (specifically, the years 1559-1567), differed from the traditional Renaissance model of architecture in two fundamental ways: it associated design and building in a continuum and it assigned responsibility for design entirely to a professional who would remain in contact with the building.

List of notable structures
 El Escorial (by Juan Bautista de Toledo and Juan de Herrera)
 University of Salamanca (unknown architect)
 New Cathedral of Salamanca (by Juan de Álava and others)
 Palace of Monterrey in Salamanca (by Rodrigo Gil de Hontañón)
 Arzobispo Fonseca College in Salamanca (by Diego de Siloé, Juan de Álava and R. G. de Hontañón)
 Convent of San Esteban in Salamanca, (by Juan de Álava and R. G. de Hontañón)
 Palace of Guzmanes in León (by R. G. de Hontañón)
 Hospital de la Santa Cruz in Toledo (by Enrique Egas and Alonso de Covarrubias)
 Hospital de Tavera, in Toledo (by Bartolomé Bustamante)
 Hospital Real, in Granada (by Enrique Egas)
 Palace of Charles V in Granada (by Pedro Machuca)
 Cathedral of Granada (by Juan Gil de Hontañón, Enrigue Egas and Diego de Siloé)
 Jaén Cathedral (by Andrés de Vandelvira)
 Cathedral of Baeza (by Vandelvira)
 Vázquez de Molina Square in Úbeda (by Vandelvira)
 Town Hall in Seville (by Diego de Riaño)
 University of Alcalá de Henares (by Rodrigo Gil de Hontañón and others)
 Royal Collegiate Church of Santa María la Mayor in Antequera, Andalusia (by Pedro del Campo)
 Hostal de los Reyes Católicos of Santiago de Compostela (by Enrique Egas)
 Town Hall of Tarazona

See also

 Renaissance architecture

References

 
Renaissance
Architectural history